The 58th Bodil Awards were held on 7 March 2004 in Imperial Cinema in Copenhagen, Denmark, honouring the best national and foreign films of 2003. Peter Mygind og Mette Horn hosted the event. Lars von Trier's Dogville won the award for Best Danish Film while The Inheritance won the awards for best actor in leading and supporting roles and Lykkevej won the awards for best actress in leading and supporting roles.

Winners

Best Danish Film 
 Dogville
 Reconstruction
 Scratch
 Stealing Rembrandt
 The Inheritance

Best Actor in a Leading Role 
 Ulrich Thomsen – The Inheritance
 Lars Brygmann – *Reconstruction
 Jakob Cedergren – Stealing Rembrandt
 Mads Mikkelsen – De grønne slagtere
 John Turturro – Fear X

Best Actress in a Leading Role 
 Birthe Neumann – Lykkevej
 Stephanie Leòn – Bagland
 Nicole Kidman – Dogville
 Maria Bonnevie ' *Reconstruction

Best Actor in a Supporting Role 
 Peter Steen – The Inheritance
 Jesper Lohmann – Lykkevej
 Nicolas Bro – Stealing Rembrandt
 Stellan Skarsgård – Dogville

Best Actress in a Supporting Role 
 Ditte Gråbøl – Lykkevej
 Bronagh Gallagher – Skagerrak
 Lisa Werlinder – The *Inheritance

Best American Film 
 Bowling for Columbine
 The Lord of the Rings: The Two Towers
 Far From Heaven
 The Hours
 Mystic River

Best Non-American Film 
 Goodbye, Lenin!
 Sweet Sixteen
 City Of God
 
 Irréversible

Bodil Special Award 
 Anders Refn

See also 

 2004 Robert Awards

References 

Bodil Awards ceremonies
2003 film awards
2004 in Copenhagen
March 2004 events in Europe